is a Japanese anime director most famous for Martian Successor Nadesico.

Works (as director) 
 Soar High! Isami
 Martian Successor Nadesico
 Martian Successor Nadesico: The Motion Picture – Prince of Darkness
 Cat Soup
 Shingu: Secret of the Stellar Wars
 Stellvia
 Ninja Scroll: The Series
 Tokyo Tribe 2
 Shigofumi: Letters from the Departed
 Bodacious Space Pirates
 Lagrange: The Flower of Rin-ne (as chief director)
 Lord Marksman and Vanadis
 Atom: The Beginning
 Yu-Gi-Oh! VRAINS (directing supervision) (episode 14 onwards)
 Helck

References

External links

Official Home Page

Anime directors
Living people
1964 births